Plats is a commune in the Ardèche department in southern France.

Population

Toponymy
Plats was called Planum in 1275, Plana in XIVe, Plais in XVIIIe, then it was called Plas and Plats. The name of the town is written プラ in Japanese, Пла in Russian and 쁠라 in Korean.

Town planning

Housing

Personalities linked to Plats

 Marie-France Banc (1876 - 1965), Righteous Among the Nations. She was born in Plats and died in Saint-Félicien.

See also
Communes of the Ardèche department

References

Communes of Ardèche
Ardèche communes articles needing translation from French Wikipedia